The BET Award for Sportswoman of the Year is given to the best and most successful female athlete of the previous year. The award was originally titled Best Female Athlete, but was later changed to its current title in 2010. As the only woman to win more than once, Serena Williams holds the record for most wins in this category with sixteen, she also holds the record for the most nominations, being nominated every year since the awards inception.

Winners and nominees
Winners are listed first and highlighted in bold.

2000s

2010s

2020s

Multiple wins and nominations

Wins
 16 wins
 Serena Williams

 2 wins
 Naomi Osaka

Nominations

 22 nominations
 Serena Williams

 16 nominations
 Venus Williams

 10 nominations
 Candace Parker

 7 nominations
 Lisa Leslie

 5 nominations
 Tamika Catchings
 Skylar Diggins-Smith
 Brittney Griner

 4 nominations
 Laila Ali
 Simone Biles
 Naomi Osaka

 3 nominations
 Gabrielle Douglas
 Sheryl Swoopes

 2 nominations
 Gail Devers
 Cheryl Ford

See also
 BET Award for Sportsman of the Year

References

BET Awards